Nyashimo is a town in Tanzania on the shores of Lake Victoria. It is the district capital of Busega District, Simiyu Region.

Transport
Paved Trunk road T4 from Mwanza to the Kenya border passes through the town.

References

Populated places in Simiyu Region